Anne Elizabeth Boyd AM (born 10 April 1946) is an Australian composer and emeritus professor of music at the University of Sydney.

Early life
Boyd was born in Sydney to James Boyd and Annie Freda Deason Boyd (née Osborn).

Her father died when she was age 3, and her mother sent her to live with relatives on a sheep station (Maneroo) near Longreach, in central Queensland. This intimate experience with the Australian landscape – its expansiveness, its dramatic changes, and its "indescribable energy" – had a profound influence on her future as a composer. She began composing while still at Maneroo, at the age of eight, for the resources she had available: recorder and voice. She moved to Canberra aged 11, and although she was pleased to be reunited with her mother, she missed the beauty of the outback terrain.

In New South Wales, she received her education at Albury High School and Hornsby Girls' High School.

Boyd studied music at the University of Sydney, where she was one of Peter Sculthorpe's first students. Sculthorpe had a profound influence on her; she said that his music was the first time she had heard music which expressed her experience of the Australian landscape. In the early 1970s she and Sculthorpe were engaged to be married, but they broke the engagement as they believed one composer in a household was enough. After receiving her Bachelor of Arts (Honours) degree, she received a PhD in composition from the University of York in England.

Career
In 1990, Boyd became the first Australian and the first woman to be appointed to a professor of music at the University of Sydney. Before that Boyd was the foundation head of the Department of Music at the University of Hong Kong (1981–90) and taught at the University of Sussex (1972–77). In 1996 she was appointed a Member of the Order of Australia for her contributions to music as a composer and as an educator.

Boyd's struggle to maintain funding for music courses in the Faculty of Arts at the University of Sydney was featured in the documentary Facing the Music (2001). The Department of Music was incorporated into the Sydney Conservatorium at the same university from the start of 2005.

Music
Many of Boyd's compositions have an East Asian influence, especially the music of Japan (such as the wood flute and the Japanese mode) and Indonesia (such as the gamelan orchestra and the Balinese modes). Many of her works are of a spiritual or meditative nature, such as the a cappella work As I Crossed a Bridge of Dreams (1975). She has written song cycles, opera, piano, choral, orchestral and chamber music. Her musical compositions include: Goldfish Through Summer Rain 1979, The Little Mermaid 1980, Black Sun 1990, Revelations of Divine Love 1995, Meditations on a Chinese Character 1996, A Vision: Jesus Reassures His Mother 1999, and YuYa 2005.

Her 2017 orchestral composition Olive Pink's Garden was inspired by the Olive Pink Botanic Garden in Alice Springs, and her 2022 opera about the life of Olive Pink was premiered there.

CDs include: Meditations on a Chinese Character 1997, and Crossing a Bridge of Dreams 2000.

Athletic performances 
Boyd is an endurance runner and marathoner, who has won her age group in marathons, half marathons and 10 km races. Boyd ran her first marathon after only 18 months training. She has been described as a 'lady of musical and running talents' and an 'inspiring distance runner', running with her daughter and raising money for cancer. She won her age group in the Sydney Striders marathon trophy.

Awards and recognition
 Member of the Order of Australia (AM), 1996 Australia Day Honours, "in recognition of service as a composer and educator"
 Awarded honorary degree by University of York, 2003
 Recipient of a Special Award for Distinguished Services to Australian Music at the APRA/AMC Classical Music Awards in 2005.

Bernard Heinze Memorial Award
The Sir Bernard Heinze Memorial Award is given to a person who has made an outstanding contribution to music in Australia.

! 
|-
| 2014 || Anne Boyd || Sir Bernard Heinze Memorial Award ||  || 
|-

References

External links
 Composer biography Australian Music Centre
 Revelations of Divine Love on ABC Classic FM's classic/amp
 "Anne Boyd – A Sense of Something of the Sacred" [radio transcript]. 2008. In Talking to Kinky and Karlheinz – 170 musicians get vocal on The Music Show ed. Anni Heino, 292–304. Sydney: ABC Books. .
Thérèse Radic (2001). "Boyd, Anne (Elizabeth)", Grove Music Online 
 

1946 births
Living people
Australian women classical composers
Academics of the University of Sussex
Academic staff of the University of Hong Kong
University of Sydney alumni
Academic staff of the Sydney Conservatorium of Music
Alumni of the University of York
Members of the Order of Australia
Australian classical composers